The 1977 Lower Hutt mayoral election was part of the New Zealand local elections held that same year. The elections were held for the role of Mayor of Lower Hutt plus other local government positions including sixteen city councillors, also elected triennially. The polling was conducted using the standard first-past-the-post electoral method.

Background
The incumbent Mayor, John Kennedy-Good, stood for a fourth term. The election was held after major flooding in December 1976. The council did not have the resources to fix the damages and had to ask the government for assistance. Prime Minister Robert Muldoon visited the flood affected areas, however antagonisms between Muldoon and some Labour Party councillors led to the funds being delayed. Once they came through the council was able to help the neighbourhoods affected. In the aftermath the council struggled to cope with building consenting administration in the flood affected areas. This caused voters to perceive the council as inept on the issue. The situation harmed Kennedy-Good who suffered a much decreased majority against his main challenger, councillor Ernie Barry, and also the Citizens' lost their large council majority, with the Labour Party winning a majority of seats. Labour's majority went down from 2 seats to 1 when councillor Lawrie Woodley defected to the Citizens' mid-term.

Mayoral results

Councillor results

Notes

References

Mayoral elections in Lower Hutt
1977 elections in New Zealand
Politics of the Wellington Region